Southampton F.C. B team and Academy or Saints B and Academy is the youth organisation run by Southampton F.C. to encourage and develop young footballers in the south of England. Renowned players including Gareth Bale, Theo Walcott, and Alan Shearer began their careers at this academy.
The team is made up of under-23 and academy players, is effectively Southampton's second-string side, but is limited to three outfield players and one goalkeeper over the age of 23 per game following the introduction of new regulations from the 2012–13 season. They play in Premier League 2, Division 2. The team also competes in the EFL Trophy, Premier League International Cup, Premier League Cup and the Hampshire Senior Cup. The under-18 players among other younger age groups make up the Academy team and play in the Premier League U18 First Division, South, Premier League U18 Cup and the FA Youth Cup.

Home fixtures are contested at A.F.C. Totton's Testwood Stadium with some fixtures being held at St. Mary's. Some games are played at the club's training facilities at Staplewood in Long Lane, Marchwood, Southampton if required. Since September 2020, the B team has been managed by David Horseman, while since August 2022, the Under 18s have been managed by Mikey Harris.

Age categories
 B team (professionals)
 Under 18
 Under 16
 Under 15
 Under 14
 Under 13
 Under 12
 Under 11
 Under 10
 Under 9
 Under 8

International players
Amongst the players who passed through the Saints Academy and went on to represent their country since the turn of the Millennium are:

 Chris Baird
 Richard Bakary
 Gareth Bale
 Leon Best
 Bartosz Białkowski
 Dexter Blackstock 
 Alan Blayney
 Faiq Jefri Bolkiah
 Wayne Bridge
 Calum Chambers
 Arron Davies
 Yoann Folly
 Danny Ings
  Lloyd Isgrove
 Adam Lallana
 Scott McDonald
 David McGoldrick
 Tyrone Mings
 Bevis Mugabi
 Jamal Musiala
 Michael Obafemi
 Alex Oxlade-Chamberlain 
 Andrejs Perepļotkins
 Lewis Price
 Ben Reeves
 Luke Shaw
 Tim Sparv
 Jake Thomson
 Yan Valery
 Theo Walcott
 James Ward-Prowse
 Ben White
 Stuart Wilkin

In the past, prior to the establishment of the academy, the Southampton youth system has produced other international players, including Terry Paine, Martin Chivers, Steve Williams, Mick Channon, Matthew Le Tissier, Kevin Phillips, Alan Shearer and Dennis Wise.

Four former Saints academy players featured in the England Under-21 match against Montenegro on 7 September 2007: Martin Cranie and Theo Walcott both started (with Walcott setting up the second goal) whilst Dexter Blackstock and Andrew Surman came on as second-half substitutes, with Surman scoring the final goal in a 3–0 victory, tapping the ball home in stoppage time from a knock-down by Blackstock.

In England's international friendly against Denmark on 5 March 2014, three graduates of the Southampton F.C. Academy appeared as second-half substitutes: Luke Shaw (making his debut), Adam Lallana and Alex Oxlade-Chamberlain.

Present structure
Matt Hale is the current Academy Director, stepping up from his role as Academy Manager in July 2019. He is assisted by Natasha Patel, who returned to the club in 2023 following a spell at New York Red Bulls. The current academy set up has teams at all age groups from Under 8s all the way through to the professional B team, employing large number of coaches and educational staff. Iain Brunnschweiler is the current Coach Development Manager for the academy. Academy players from the age of 16 up until the age of 18 are often looked after by Host Families within the local area.

Director of Football operations Matt Crocker, who was previously Academy Manager, and current CEO Rasmus Ankersen currently oversee academy recruitment, while Rod Ruddick, Jim Flood and Wayne Stephens are all involved in youth recruitment for the academy along with the club scouting team.

The aim of the Southampton academy is to "...produce Premiership class players..."

Southampton has regularly reached the latter stages of the FA Youth Cup, as well as being successful in the FA Premier Academy League championship. In the 2010–2011 season the U18s were only just "...Pipped to the Title..." by one point on the last day of the season of the Group A league. Southampton had to win and Fulham had to draw or lose for Southampton to come top. After winning 1–3 away to Coventry City the U18s were dismayed to discover Fulham had come back from being 0–3 down versus Leicester City to win 5–3.

The academy has joined up with local college Sparsholt College to try to give those footballers who have missed out on a scholarship the opportunity to remain in the game and train and play matches with the Southampton Academy.

In May 2013, Andre Villas-Boas, manager of Tottenham Hotspur praised the Southampton Academy for its ability to produce star players, describing it as "a great school of development" and comparing it to Sporting Lisbon.

In April 2015, a Southampton U21 side won the U21 Premier League Cup, defeating a Blackburn Rovers U21 side in the two-legged final at St Mary's Stadium in front of more than 12,000 fans. Goals from Ryan Seager and Sam Gallagher cancelled out a Matt Targett own goal to give Southampton a 2–1 victory after extra time to win the second edition of the cup.

In September 2020, Southampton revamped their Under-23s programme to 'enhance the pathway into the first team for its younger players.' A 'structure and philosophical overhaul' saw the Under-23s side become a B team. The new B team will mirror the training programmes, coaching and style of play of the first team. Training and fixtures, where possible, will also be organised so it does not clash with the first team so the first team manager and coaches can watch the side train or play and also take part in coaching sessions. The side will still continue to participate in the same competitions as before the revamp.

Under new club Director of Football Matt Crocker, individual player coaches have been brought into to try and improve players coming through the academy. Lee Skyrme was appointed B team individual player coach in 2021, while Mikey Harris was appointed in the same role for the U18s in the same year. Harris was replaced in 2022 by Pete Haynes, with Harris having been promoted to U18 head coach.

B team squad

Players (excluding scholars) who will qualify as B team players in season 2022–23 (i.e. born on or after 1 January 2001) and who are outside the first team squad.

 Squad numbers represent numbers given to players for first team and EFL Trophy matches only. 
 ± Denotes a player on an 'extended scholarship'.
 * Denotes a player who is overage (born before 1 January 2001) and outside of the first team squad.

Out on loan

B team & U23 Honours

Leagues
Premier League 2, Division 2
2nd (promoted via playoffs): 2018–19

Cups
U21 Premier League Cup 
Winners: 2014–15
Southampton Senior Cup
Winners: 2017–18
South Shields International Tournament
Winners: 2018–19

Under-18 squad

Academy 2nd Years 2022–23

 * = Professional contracts

Academy 1st Years 2022–23

 * = Professional contracts

U18 Honours

Leagues
U18 Premier League, Division 1
Champions (South Group), National runners-up: 2021–22

Cups
FA Youth Cup 
Runners-up: 2004–05

Staff
 Academy Leads
Academy Director: Matt Hale
Assistant Academy Director: Natasha Patel
Head of Youth Recruitment: Dan Rice
Head of Academy Medical Services: Tom Sturdy
Coach Development Manager: Iain Brunnschweiler

 B team / Under-18 management
B team Coach: David Horseman
B team Individual Player Coach: Lee Skyrme
U18 Coach: Mikey Harris
U18 Individual Player Coach: Pete Haynes
Development Coach: Louis Carey
Development Coach: Sam McQueen
Development Goalkeeping Coach: Ryan Flood
Development Goalkeeping Coach: Steve Grinham
Academy Liaison Officer: Ian Herding

Academy graduates (2000–present)
A number of players from the Southampton F.C. Academy have gone on to have careers in professional football, whether at Southampton or at other clubs. The following is a list of players who have made their Southampton first-team debuts since the turn of the millennium. Players who have represented Southampton in only the EFL Trophy are not included in this list. Academy graduates who still play for Southampton, including those that are currently out on loan to other clubs, are highlighted in green. Where players have made their debut in the same fixture, they are sorted alphabetically by surname.

References

External links
 Southampton Under-23s at saintsfc.co.uk
 Southampton Under-18s at saintsfc.co.uk
 The Southampton FC academy way – These Football Times'' (2015)

Professional Development League
Academy
Football academies in England
Premier League International Cup